János Sándor de Csíkszentmihály (14 November 1860 – 16 July 1922) was a Hungarian politician, who served as Interior Minister between 1913 and 1917 in István Tisza's second cabinet. János Sándor was the brother-in-law of Count Tisza.

References
 Magyar Életrajzi Lexikon

1860 births
1922 deaths
People from Târgu Mureș
Hungarian Interior Ministers